Tennessee Creek may refer to:

Tennessee Creek (Arkansas River), a stream in Colorado
Tennessee Creek (Mississippi), a stream in Mississippi
Tennessee Creek (Missouri), a stream in Missouri